"De Hoy en Adelante" ("From Now On") is a song by Puerto Rican singer Millie Corretjer (credited simply as Millie) from her third studio album, Amar Es un Juego  (1999). It was released as the second single in 1999 and became her second #1 on the Latin Pop Airplay chart and her first on the Hot Latin Songs chart  in the US. El Norte Deborah Davis favorably compared it to Cher stating that the artist "taps into the rich vein that has served Cher so well in recent months: emotionally surviving marital disasters. So if you're a woman looking for another battle hymn, turn to Millie ASAP." El Nuevo Heralds Eliseo Cardona cited it as one of the tracks where Corretjer as the "plate having salvageable parts" on the album.  It was recognized as one of the best-performing songs of the year at the ASCAP Latin Awards under the pop/ballad category in 2000.

Charts

Weekly charts

Year-end charts

See also 
List of number-one Billboard Hot Latin Tracks of 1999
List of Billboard Latin Pop Airplay number ones of 1999

References

1999 singles
1999 songs
1990s ballads
Millie Corretjer songs
Pop ballads
Spanish-language songs
Songs written by Rudy Pérez
EMI Latin singles